Mick Mashbir is a guitarist who played on Alice Cooper's Billion Dollar Babies and Muscle of Love albums. In 1978, he toured with Flo & Eddie of Frank Zappa's band. In 1985, he played with The Turtles. In 2006, he released his solo album Keepin the Vibe Alive.

External links
 http://www.mickmashbir.com

American rock guitarists
American male guitarists
Living people
Year of birth missing (living people)
Place of birth missing (living people)
20th-century American guitarists
20th-century American male musicians